G103 may refer to any of the following:
 China National Highway 103, a major trunk route in China
 Grob G103a Twin II, a two-seater sailplane made by Grob Aerospace
 R-1820-G103, a model of the Wright R-1820 aircraft engine